Aygedzor is a village in the Meghri Municipality of the Syunik Province in Armenia.

Demographics 
The Statistical Committee of Armenia reported its population was 17 at the 2001 census.

References 

Populated places in Syunik Province